David Rooney (born 16 January 1975) was an English cricketer. He was a right-handed batsman and a right-arm medium-fast bowler who played for Cumberland. He was born in Whitehaven.

Rooney made his cricketing debut in June 2002, in the 38-County Cup.

Rooney made a single List A appearance for the team, during 2003, against Scotland in the Cheltenham & Gloucester Trophy.

As of 2008, Rooney still appears occasionally for Cumberland in the Minor Counties Championship.

Rooney has been said to resemble a tatie (potato), which may often confuse people, but it can be confirmed by another local cricketer from Cumbria: Clarence Fletcher (AKA Kenneth Phatknack).

External links
David Rooney at Cricket Archive 

1975 births
Living people
English cricketers
Cumberland cricketers
Sportspeople from Whitehaven
Cricketers from Cumbria